The Asitka Formation is a geologic formation in British Columbia. It preserves fossils dating back to the Permian period.

See also

 List of fossiliferous stratigraphic units in British Columbia

References
 

Permian British Columbia
Permian northern paleotemperate deposits